Looptopia was a dusk-to-dawn cultural event that was held in 2007 and 2008 in the city of Chicago. Billed as "Chicago's White Night", Looptopia was modeled after Nuit Blanche held annually in Paris. It premiered on the evening of May 11 through the morning May 12, 2007 in Chicago's central business district, the Loop. A wide range of entertainment was offered in public spaces, while many universities, museums, restaurants, parks and tourist attractions in the loop remained open throughout the night or offered extended hours.  It was the first event of its type held in Chicago or the United States. The 2007 event drew an estimated 200,000 attendees, twice the number that organizers expected, which led to logistical problems like lack of sanitation facilities.

Looptopia 2007 events

Many events were held at Looptopia 2007.

Dance party
A dance party was held in the Sullivan dock of the former Carson Pirie Scott store.  The dance party was produced by MF Chicago, a local creative collaborative made up of artists, DJs, VJs, and musicians, and featured house music, lighting and video projection effects.  In addition to a multimedia show, the entrance to the dance party featured a neon and broccoli installation by Chicago-based installation artist Josh Graff.
DJs for the event were Chicago Legends Paul Johnson Adonis Childs Geoff bring the roof down Chicago style

State Street and Daley Plaza

Theatre event engineering company Redmoon Theater had sight installations all along State Street that culminated in a roving performance with a final show in Daley Plaza that featured the capture of human-sized rat that was locked in a rat wheel that set off pyrotechnics before an audience estimated to number 15,000.
Musical ensemble Mucca Pazza performed at Looptopia on the Daley Plaza stage.

Oscar shorts
In the Gene Siskel Film Center, short films were screened throughout the night.  Up first were short films from the students of the School of the Art Institute of Chicago.  These were followed by Oscar nominated and winning shorts in both animation and live action.

Sci-Fi B-Movie marathon
At the Chicago Cultural Center from 2 AM - 6 AM, classic sci-fi films were screened.  Those shown included Earth vs. the Flying Saucers, It Came from Outer Space, and Invasion of the Body Snatchers.

Miss Looptopia
Nine contestants competed in this mock drag beauty pageant held at the Hard Rock Hotel. Produced by a local LGBT marketing firm, the show was EmCee'd by Andrew Eninger of the gay comedy troupe GayCo Productions. There were comedy, musical and drag performance by GayCo members, local drag queens and other local performers. The announcement of the winner was carried live on ABC/Channel 7 "190 North" by host Janet Davies. The event reached its 350-person capacity before its start time of 6:00 PM.

Public reaction

The inaugural Looptopia event exceeded attendance estimates and was generally well received by participants. Argo Tea reported their "best day ever" in terms of sales. The Chicago Cultural Center (on Washington Street) hosted a record number of guests (an estimated 10,000–12,000 people).  Pizano's Pizza recorded a 50% increase in business.  Local newspapers such as the Chicago Sun Times and Chicago Tribune printed favorable reviews, with the Tribune reporting "to call the inaugural Looptopia a success would be an understatement."

2007 Looptopia critics
Not all reactions were favorable.  Many internet bloggers spoke of the swarms of people overcrowding the event.  Looptopia 2007 also fell on an extremely cold night for mid-May in Chicago.

Photo gallery

See also
 Long Night of Museums
 Nuit Blanche

External links

 The Looptopia Website from archive.org
 
 
 

Festivals in Chicago
Defunct festivals
Arts festivals in the United States

References